Kimmo Kalevi Tiilikainen (born 17 August 1966, Ruokolahti) is a Finnish politician from the Centre Party. He is an organic farmer and forester. Tiilikainen served as the Minister of Agriculture and the Environment from 2015 to 2019. He is also a former Minister of the Environment of Finland from 2007 to 2008.

Currently Tiilikainen is the Chairman of the Centre Party Parliamentary Group and a member of the Finnish Parliament. He is also a city council member in his home municipality in Ruokolahti.

Early career
Tiilikainen graduated in 1991 from the University of Joensuu as a Master of Science in Agriculture and Forestry.

In the beginning of 1990's Tiilikainen was elected as the chairman of Finnish Organic Food Association. He made his first attempt to the Finnish Parliament as a nonaligned candidate on the list of the Green League. He switched to the Centre Party in 1997 explaining that "the Greens were not ecological enough".

Tiilikainen was elected to the Finnish Parliament on his third attempt in 2003.

Other activities
 United Nations Environment Programme (UNEP), Vice President of the Bureau of the Assembly (2018-2019)

References

1966 births
Living people
People from Ruokolahti
Centre Party (Finland) politicians
Minister of the Environment of Finland
Ministers of Agriculture of Finland
Members of the Parliament of Finland (2003–07)
Members of the Parliament of Finland (2007–11)
Members of the Parliament of Finland (2011–15)
Members of the Parliament of Finland (2015–19)
Finnish foresters
Organic farmers